First Twenty Years or variants may refer to:
The First Twenty Years (Spock's Beard album) (2015)
Arkham House: The First 20 Years
Centuries of Torment: The First 20 Years, a 2000 documentary by Cannibal Corpse
Never Say Never: The First 20 Years
Tuml = Lebn: The Best of the First 20 Years, a 2008 album by The Klezmatics
The First Twenty Years, a 2010 album by Mississippi Mass Choir
The First 20 Years, a 2004 album by Papa Wemba
First 20 Years at the Top, a 1995 box set by The Shadows
The First Twenty Years, a 2001 album by Glenn Shorrock
Live: The First Twenty Years, a book about Saturday Night Live
Hellboy: The First 20 Years, a 2014 Hellboy annual by Mike Mignola and Scott Allie

See also
 The First Ten Years (disambiguation)